Özden Ezinler (born 24 July 1950) is a Turkish fencer. She competed in the women's individual foil event at the 1972 Summer Olympics.

References

External links
 

1950 births
Living people
Turkish female foil fencers
Olympic fencers of Turkey
Fencers at the 1972 Summer Olympics
Turkish foil fencers